Whitney Dow, born in 1961, is a documentary filmmaker, producer, and director. He is best known for Two Towns of Jasper (co-directed by Marco Williams), a film about the murder of a black man committed by three white men in Jasper, Texas, which received a George Foster Peabody Award and an Alfred I. duPont-Columbia University Award. Two Towns of Jasper was broadcast on the PBS documentary series POV in 2003. The film and the directors were featured on The Oprah Winfrey Show and Nightline. The film was the catalyst for a live town hall meeting, "America in Black and White," anchored by Ted Koppel.

In 2014, Dow launched Whiteness Project with POV. Whiteness Project is an online "interactive investigation" into the experiences of white Americans. The interactive project received national attention and coverage from accredited news sources like NPR, New York and CBS. The first installment, "Inside the White/Caucasian Box," is a collection of 21 interviews filmed in Buffalo, New York, that includes data enforcing or refuting the interviewees' statements.

Dow had directed more than 200 shorts and commercials by 1998 when he co-founded Two Tone Productions, a company that creates films addressing issues of race. In addition to directing films such as Two Towns of Jasper, I Sit Where I Want, Unfinished Country and When the Drum is Beating, he has also produced numerous films including Freedom Summer, Banished (film) and Toots (film). Dow's work has also been exhibited at the Metropolitan Museum of Art, the Museum of Modern Art (MoMA) and the Smithsonian Institution.

References

External links
''Two Towns of Jasper' site for POV on PBS
Two Tone Productions

Columbia University alumni
American directors
1961 births
Living people